is a Japanese horror manga series written and illustrated by Junji Ito. Appearing as a serial in the weekly seinen manga magazine Big Comic Spirits from 1998 to 1999, the chapters were compiled into three bound volumes by Shogakukan and published from August 1998 to September 1999. In March 2000, Shogakukan released an omnibus edition, followed by a second omnibus version in August 2010. In North America, Viz Media serialized an English-language translation of the series in its monthly magazine Pulp from February 2001 to August 2002. Viz Media then published the volumes from October 2001 to October 2002, with a re-release from October 2007 to February 2008, and published a hardcover omnibus edition in October 2013.

The series tells the story of the citizens of Kurouzu-cho, a fictional city which is plagued by a supernatural curse involving spirals. The story for Uzumaki originated when Ito attempted to write a story about people living in a very long terraced house, and he was inspired to use a spiral shape to achieve the desired length. Ito believes the horror of Uzumaki is effective due to its subversion of symbols which are positively portrayed in Japanese media, and its theme of protagonists struggling against a mysterious force stronger than themselves. Uzumaki continues to receive critical acclaim, deemed by many as Ito's magnum opus.

The manga was adapted into two video games for the WonderSwan and a Japanese live-action film directed by Higunchinsky. The manga has received generally positive reviews from English-language critics. It was nominated for an Eisner Award in 2003, and placed in the Young Adult Library Services Association's list of the "Top 10 Graphic Novels for Teens" in 2009. An anime television series adaptation animated by Drive and co-produced by Production I.G USA and Adult Swim has been announced, and is scheduled to premiere in the United States on Adult Swim's Toonami programming block before Japan.

Plot

As the story progresses, Kirie and Shuichi witness how the spiral curse affects the people around them, causing the citizens to become obsessed or paranoid about spirals. Shuichi becomes reclusive after both of his parents die from the horrific psychological and physical powers of the spirals, but also gains the ability to detect when the spiral curse is taking place, although he is often dismissed until the next paranormal effects of the curse become obvious. Eventually, Kirie is affected by the curse as well, when her hair begins to curl into an unnatural spiral pattern, drains her life energy to hypnotize the citizens, and chokes her whenever she attempts to cut it off. Shuichi is able to cut her hair and save her. The curse continues to plague the town until a series of typhoons conjured by the curse destroys most of its structures. The only remaining buildings are ancient abandoned terraced houses, which the citizens are forced first to move into, and then begin expanding as they grow more and more crowded.

As a series of increasingly powerful earthquakes and additional destruction from delinquents able to utilize strong winds strike the town, Kirie and Shuichi devise a plan to escape Kurouzu-cho, but when they attempt to escape, their efforts are unsuccessful. After returning to the town, they discover that several years have passed since they left, as time speeds up away from the spiral. The other citizens have expanded the terraced houses until they connected into a single structure forming a labyrinthine spiral pattern, but have become mutated as a consequence of overcrowding, their limbs twisting and warping into spirals. Kirie and Shuichi decide to search for Kirie's parents, which brings them to the center after many days of walking through the labyrinth.

At the center, Shuichi is hurled down a pit leading deep beneath the earth by a mutated citizen, with Kirie herself descending via a colossal spiral staircase to find him. She falls but is saved by countless bodies making up the ground of a vast, ancient city consisting entirely of spiral patterns in various arrangements. As Kirie looks for Shuichi, she finds her parents twisted and petrified, resembling stone statues, along with many other citizens of Kurouzu-cho who have met the same fate. Then, she hears Shuichi call for her and goes to him. Both are overwhelmed by the ancient spirals surrounding them and Shuichi points out how it seems as though the spiral ruins have a will of their own. Noticing that the petrified citizens of Kurouzu-cho are all facing the spiral city, Shuichi theorizes that this is the source of the curse; the city expands on its own periodically and has cursed the land above out of jealousy from having no one to view it.

Shuichi urges Kirie to leave without him as he can no longer walk, and that the curse should be over soon, but she replies that she does not have the strength and wishes to stay with him. The two embrace with their bodies twisting and intertwining together, signifying their acceptance into the never-ending curse. At the same time, a stone tower in the shape of a drill bit rises out of the city, and breaches the surface, forming the centerpiece of the abandoned town. As Shuichi and Kirie lie together, Kirie notes that the curse ended at the same time it began, for just as time speeds up away from the center, it freezes at the center. The spiral's curse is eternal, and all the events will repeat when a new Kurouzu-cho is built where the previous one lay.

Characters
Kirie Goshima

Shuichi Saito

Kirie's father

Shuichi's father

Yukie Saito

Azami Kurotani

Katayama

Okada

Tsumura

Yokota

Shiho

Development
Uzumaki was written and illustrated by Junji Ito. Junji Ito's initial desire was to create a story about strange changes that would occur to people living in a very long, traditional Japanese terraced house. This story would have been based on Ito's personal experience living in such a house as a child. During the process of finding a way to draw such a long building, Ito was inspired by the shape of a mosquito coil and decided he could make the building long by having it spiral. Ito has noted that the spiral is a "mysterious pattern" and described writing Uzumaki as an attempt to learn the secrets of the spiral. Ito sought inspiration by methods such as staring at spirals, researching spirals, creating spiral patterns by draining water from bath tubs, eating foods with spiral patterns, and raising snails. Looking back on the series in 2006, Ito stated that while he was still uncertain what the spiral stood for, he thought it might be representative of infinity.

Uzumaki was influenced by the positive representation of spirals in media, which inspired Ito to subvert them to create horror, stating: "Usually spiral patterns mark character's cheeks in Japanese comedy cartoons, representing an effect of warmth. However, I thought it could be used in horror if I drew it a different way." The story in which Kirie's hair is cursed by the spiral reflects a recurring theme in Ito's work in which a heroine's hair has a life of its own. Ito uses this imagery because it lends itself well to horror due to its association with the Japanese feminine ideal (Yamato nadeshiko), as well as the unnerving flowing motions of long hair, which he describes as snakelike. Ito also noted that horror writer H. P. Lovecraft was one of his inspirations when creating Uzumaki, stating that the gradual development of the spiral curse was patterned on Lovecraft's storytelling and that "Lovecraft's expressionism with regard to atmosphere greatly inspires my creative impulse."

Publication
The manga began as a serial in the weekly manga magazine Big Comic Spirits from 1998 to 1999. Shogakukan compiled the chapters into three bound volumes and published them from August 1998 to September 1999. To celebrate the release of the live-action film, the manga series was released in an omnibus volume in March 2000, with an additional "lost" chapter. Shogakukan released another omnibus edition on August 30, 2010, with the same content and additional commentary from Masaru Sato.

In North America, Viz Media serialized an English-language translation of the series in its monthly magazine Pulp from the February 2001 issue to the August 2002 issue. It published volumes of the series from October 2001 to October 2002. Viz Media re-released the series with new covers from October 2007 to February 2008, and published the omnibus volume in hardcover with twelve color pages on October 13, 2013. The series has also been translated into other languages, such as Spanish, French, Brazilian Portuguese, Polish, Swedish, Mandarin, Korean, and Serbian.

Notes

Related media

Anime
At 2019's Crunchyroll Expo, a 4-episode anime television series adaptation was announced. The series is animated by Drive and co-produced by Production I.G USA and Adult Swim's in-house production arm Williams Street. The anime will be directed by Hiroshi Nagahama, with Colin Stetson composing music. It will air on Adult Swim's Toonami programming block before its Japanese premiere. This is the fourth time Cartoon Network, as an entire network, was directly involved in production of a Japanese anime, with The Big O (2nd season only), IGPX (both the 2005 micro-series and 2006 anime), and the FLCL sequels, all receiving some form of animated production that was backed by the network. Creative director Jason DeMarco has stated that as of March 25, 2020, production is still in progress, and that the COVID-19 pandemic has currently had no effect on production. In an interview with Ito, he speaks of Hiroshi Nagahama in respect calling him quite talented. He also said that being faithful to his original manga made him "quite happy". Ito confirmed that the screenplay of the series is finished, since he checked. He says "Four episodes is way shorter than the original manga. They did a good job of rearranging the series. For example, someone who dies early on, now plays an important role later on. They did a fantastic job of crafting things together like that. The screenwriter is a very talented individual." The anime will be produced entirely in black and white. On June 10, 2020, the anime's official Twitter account presented some pictures of storyboards. On July 22, 2020, the official Twitter announced the Japanese voice cast. On July 26, 2020, Adult Swim reran the same teaser trailer during its Adult Swim Con and presented an interview with series director Nagahama. In addition to this, it was confirmed that the series was being moved back a year from its originally planned 2020 release. On July 29, 2020, the Japanese voice cast officially started recording. A second teaser video was posted on June 15, 2021, with comments from director Hiroshi Nagahama describing how the pandemic forced the team to "restructure" their plan for the anime from scratch. The video also confirmed that the anime would be delayed again to October 2022. In June 2022, Corus Entertainment confirmed through a press release that the series would also be broadcast on Adult Swim in Canada. Later that same month, the anime was once again delayed indefinitely at the request of the production staff.

Live-action film

In 2000, a live-action adaptation of Uzumaki was released in Japan. Directed by Higunchinsky, it featured Eriko Hatsune as Kirie Goshima, Shin Eun-kyung as Chie Maruyama, Fhi Fan as Shuichi Saito, Keiko Takahashi as Yukie Saito, Ren Osugi as Toshio Saito, and Hinako Saeki as Kyoko Sekino. The film consists of four parts ("A Premonition", "Erosion", "Visitation", and "Transmigration"), and as a result of being produced before the manga's conclusion, uses a different ending than the manga.

Video games
Two video games were developed and published by Omega Micott for the Bandai WonderSwan. The first, was released on February 3, 2000, and is a visual novel retelling the events of the manga. Kirie Goshima's actor, Eriko Hatsune makes a special appearance. The second game, titled , was released on March 4, 2000, and is a simulation game. The objective is to spread the curse across the town and find hidden objects to gain more "Spiral Power" and progress the story. The title also includes a mini-game involving one of the snail-human hybrids.

Reception
Uzumaki was nominated for an Eisner Award in the category of "Best U.S. Edition of Foreign Material" in 2003. The Young Adult Library Services Association chose the first volume for its list of the "Top 10 Great Graphic Novels for Teens" in 2009. The manga was also included on its list of the 53 "Great Graphic Novels for Teens". Viz Media's Deluxe edition ranked No. 172 in Diamond's Top 300 Graphic Novels in October 2013 with a total of 784 copies sold. IGN placed Uzumaki at #2 under their "Top 10 Horror/Thriller Manga" list. About.com's Deb Aoki placed Uzumaki in her list of recommended horror manga, describing it as a classic of the genre. Uzumaki appeared in 1001 Comics You Must Read Before You Die (2011), and the reviewer wrote that it reminded him of the works of H.P. Lovecraft. MyM magazine praised the manga, calling it "one of the scariest manga series around."

In Manga: The Complete Guide (2007), Jason Thompson gave Uzumaki three and a half stars, and wrote that, taken as a whole, the manga succeeds as "an elegant and sometimes blackly humorous story of dreamlike logic and nihilism." Thompson featured the manga again in his House of 1000 Manga blog, praising it for its originality, in that it revolved around "a certain nightmarish, fatalistic way of looking at the world". Comics Alliance author and comic artist, Sara Horrocks, also praised the manga, stating "What makes Uzumaki such a strong work is how precise it is in its mechanics. It is meticulous in the way that a curse might be."

For the first volume, Theron Martin from Anime News Network gave it a 'B', praising the art style and character designs, including Viz Media's new cover design. He stated, however, that "some of the attempts at horror get too preposterous for their own good." Greg Hackmann of Mania gave it an A, praising both its "well-honed" art and Ito's ability to form an effective overarching plot out of Uzumakis loosely connected substories. Barb Lien-Cooper of Sequential Tart gave it a 7 out of 10, stating "The art is clean and simple. It works to help maintain the paranoia. The tone and pacing of this story are also just right. Altogether, one of the better horror stories I've read this year." Ken Haley of PopCultureShock gave it an 'A' and praised Ito's effective use of body horror, though he noted that some of the curse's effects were more humorous than frightening.

For the second volume, Lien-Cooper gave it 8 out of 10 stating, "What astounds me about Junji Ito's work is its deceptive simplicity and its flawless execution." Sheena McNeil, also from Sequential Tart, instead gave it a 9 out of 10, citing the novel effects of the curse Ito invented. Hackmann, however, gave it a 'B', explaining that "Unfortunately, this shift in story format is largely a failed experiment: with the overarching escape storyline put on hiatus, a good number of these disconnected episodes degenerate into simple, "lookit, weird stuff happening" horrorfests that lack much of the creative spark exhibited throughout the first Uzumaki collection."

When reviewing the third and final volume, Haley again gave it an 'A', praising Junji Ito for providing answers to questions previously asked but not answered in a heavy or mundane form. Lien-Cooper gave the conclusion a 6 out of 10, and criticized the initial ending as nonsensical and the expanded background given in "Galaxies" as uninteresting.

References

External links
  
 Uzumaki at Viz Media
 Uzumaki at Adult Swim
 

1998 manga
Adult Swim original programming
Anime postponed due to the COVID-19 pandemic
Anime series based on manga
Dark fantasy anime and manga
Psychological horror anime and manga
Seinen manga
Spirals
Supernatural anime and manga
Toonami
Upcoming anime television series
Viz Media manga